Murce (also known as MIG-G-0900) is a class of fast patrol craft operated by naval forces of Iran.

History 
Murce boats are manufactured in Iran by Marine Industries Group. Its unarmed version has been produced in large numbers since the mid-1990s.

Design

Dimensions and machinery 
It is powered by two Volvo Penta diesel engines.

Armament 
Murce-class boats are equipped with three 12.7mm machine guns, one 106mm recoilless rifle or RPG-7 rocket launcher, as well as a 12-barelled 107mm multiple rocket launcher. They also use surface search radar on I-band.

References 

Fast patrol boat classes of the Navy of the Islamic Revolutionary Guard Corps
Ships built by Marine Industries Organization